Librije's Zusje can refer to:
 Librije's Zusje (Zwolle), former restaurant with two Michelin stars, closed down 2014
 Librije's Zusje (Amsterdam), restaurant with two Michelin stars (2015).